Mourad Melki (born 9 May 1975) is a Tunisian footballer.

He was a member of the Tunisian national team during the World Cups in 1998 and 2002.

International goals

External links
 

1975 births
Living people
Tunisian footballers
1998 FIFA World Cup players
2002 FIFA World Cup players
Tunisia international footballers
2002 African Cup of Nations players
Olympique Béja players
Espérance Sportive de Tunis players
AS Marsa players
CS M'saken players
People from Kef Governorate
Association football midfielders